Geoff Richards (born 30 April 1951) is a former rugby union player and coach. He coached  at the 2006 Women's Rugby World Cup. He resigned as head coach in 2007.

In 2010, he resigned as coach for Richmond. Due to the injury toll faced by the Wallabies in their tour of New Zealand in 1978, Richards was selected to play for the Wallabies.

References

External links
ESPN Scrum Profile
ESPN UK Profile

1951 births
Living people
English rugby union coaches
Australia international rugby union players
Coaches of international rugby union teams
Rugby union players from London
Rugby union fullbacks